Patriarca may refer to:

Patriarca crime family, an Italian-American crime family based in New England
Patriarca (São Paulo Metro), a São Paulo Metro station

People with the surname
Camilla Patriarca (born 1994), Italian rhythmic gymnast
Raymond Patriarca, Jr. (born 1945), American mobster